Matthias Billen (29 March 1910 – 1 July 1989) was a German international footballer.

References

1910 births
1989 deaths
Association football forwards
German footballers
Germany international footballers
VfL Osnabrück players